Frederick Reef is in the Coral Sea Islands, over  northeast of Gladstone, Queensland. The reef gets its name from Frederick, which first reported sighting the reef.

Frederick Reef is a small atoll with a large rock called Ridge Rock at the southern end, a sand cay called Observatory Cay, and a lighthouse at the northern end, which is the only permanently dry land, although there are a few of others cays that can be awash at high tide. The reef is around 30km2.

The reefs are in a J shape that forms a semi-enclosed lagoon known as Anchorage Sound, with an opening on the North side.

General description 

The Frederick Reefs are a small group of remote reefs located beyond the southern reaches of the Great Barrier Reef,

The reefs are part of the southern reefs of the Coral Sea and as such are located in deep oceanic waters off the Coral Sea Shelf.

The reefs form a semi-enclosed lagoon or body of water known as Anchorage Sound; protected on most sides but open on the north side. On the southern side of the reef lies Observatory Cay, (21°02'S., 154°23'E.), the only permanently dry land, although there are a few of others cays that can be awash at high tide. As the cay lies near the southern edge of the reef, the surf sometimes breaks over it in heavy gales.

Similar to other smaller sand cays and spits, the position of the sand spit can move. It has also been reported that the reef complex has at least 4 or 5 other sand cays on the southern reef which does not cover with water at high tide other than Observatory Cay.

Danger Ridge (21°00'S., 154°21'E.) is a narrow ridge connecting the western end of Observation Cay and Ridge Rock.

The Light is located at the northeastern tip of the reef which is the only section permanently out of the water. The Light is accessible by boat only.

History

Discovery 
The reefs were discovered in 1812 by the Frederick. The reefs were described in the ship's log:

Shipwreck of Royal Charlotte 
On 29 April 1825, Royal Charlotte arrived in Sydney from England with a load of convicts. The ship then took on detachments of the 20th, 46th, and 49th Regiments for transport to India by Batavia. On 11 June, the ship ran aground on Frederick Reefs; the masts were cut away to steady her while the crew and soldiers moved to shore with water and provisions before she sank. Only two lives were lost. A party took the surviving longboat and travelled to Moreton Bay, arriving in July and causing the brig Amity to be dispatched to collect survivors.

The discovery of the wreck was announced in January 2012.

Grounding of USS Tiru 
On 2 November 1966, the United States submarine USS Tiru departed from Brisbane for Subic Bay. On 4 November, the submarine ran aground on Frederick Reef. For two days, the submarine attempted to back off the reef under her own power, but was unsuccessful. On 6 November, Australian destroyer HMAS Vendetta and civilian tugboat Carlock arrived to assist the salvage of Tiru. The submarine was towed to Brisbane, where she was drydocked for emergency repairs and damage assessment.

Following temporary repairs to her sonar dome, outer hull, and keel, the submarine gingerly made her way from Australia to the United States Naval Ship Repair Facility, Yokosuka, Japan. En route, Tiru called at Guam to provision alongside  and pick up new crew members. Arriving at Yokosuka on 29 November, the submarine entered drydock for restricted availability.

Grounding of Jhansi Ki Rani 
On 23 April 1986, Jhansi Ki Rani, an India-flagged bulk carrier departed from Newcastle, New South Wales for Japan with 74,000 tonnes of coal on board.

It was assumed that this was the Frederick Reefs Lighthouse, but was actually another ship, MV Fort Resolution. While attempting to clarify the indistinct radar signal, it became obscured by rain clutter, then vanished. Assumed to be a ship, the lookout was instructed to keep watch off the starboard bow. The ship's Master arrived on the bridge at 1725, to confirm the progress of the voyage and to prepare for the passing of Frederick Reefs.

Shortly after this, the Chief Officer and lookout both reported a white line close ahead; waves breaking over the edge of the reef. The ship was ordered to swing hard to port, but did not swing far enough to clear the southern edge of the reef, running aground  from the tower. The engines were stopped, and at 1736 were put full astern in an attempt to pull the ship off the reef. After almost two hours, the failed attempts ceased.

Some oil pollution was observed after the grounding. This pollution was attributed to the forward oil fuel deep tank, which was damaged. All other fuel tanks were situated aft and were intact .

The vessel was recovered and refloated on 4 May, and after being anchored for inspection, was towed to Singapore for repairs, then put up for auction with her cargo of coal.

See also 
 List of lighthouses in the Coral Sea Islands
 List of islands of Australia

References 

 Loney, J. K. (Jack Kenneth), 1925–1995. Australian shipwrecks Vol. 1 through 5

External links 
 
 Detailed report of the USS Tiru incident from the Australian Navy
 nautical description (Sailing Directions)

Great Barrier Reef
Coral Sea Islands
Reefs of Australia
Lighthouses in Coral Sea Islands